Piranha to Scurfy is a short story collection by British writer Ruth Rendell, published in 2000. The collection takes its unusual name from the first story featured, which itself is named after a volume of the Encyclopædia Britannica.

Contents 

The volume contains 9 short stories and 2 longer novellas:
 Piranha to Scurfy (novella)
 Computer Seance
 Fair Exchange
 The Wink
 Catamount
 Walter's Leg
 The Professional
 The Beach Butler
 The Astronomical Scarf
 High Mysterious Union (novella)
 Myth (NB: not included in the US edition)

References

External links 
 Piranha to Scurfy on Internet Archive
 Piranha to Scurfy and Other Stories on Goodreads

2000 short story collections
Short story collections by Ruth Rendell
Hutchinson (publisher) books
Doubleday Canada books
Crown Publishing Group books